The Jönköping Regiment, designation I 12, was a Swedish Army infantry regiment that traced its origins back to the 16th century. It was merged with another unit to form a new regiment in 1927. The regiment's soldiers were originally recruited from Jönköping County, and it was later garrisoned there.

History 
The regiment has its origins in fänikor (companies) raised in Jönköping County in the 1550s and 1560s. In 1619, these units—along with fänikor from the nearby province of Östergötland—were organised by Gustav II Adolf into Östergötlands storregemente, of which eleven of the total 24 companies were recruited in Jönköping County. Östergötlands storregemente consisted of three field regiments, of which Jönköping Regiment was one. Sometime between 1623 and 1628, the grand regiment was permanently split into three smaller regiments, of which Jönköping Regiment was one.

Jönköping Regiment was one of the original 20 Swedish infantry regiments mentioned in the Swedish constitution of 1634, although it was mentioned as one of two regiments that should merge to form Småland Regiment, but that regiment was never formed and instead Jönköping Regiment and Kronoberg Regiment were kept separate. The regiment's first commander was Lars Kagg. The regiment was allotted in 1684. The regiment was given the designation I 12 (12th Infantry Regiment) in a general order in 1816. Jönköping Regiment was garrisoned in Jönköping from 1909, before it was merged with Kalmar Regiment to form Jönköping-Kalmar Regiment in 1927.

Campaigns 

The Polish War (1600–1629)
The Thirty Years' War (1630–1648)
The Northern Wars (1655–1661)
The Scanian War (1674–1679)
The Great Northern War (1700–1721)
The Seven Years' War (1757–1762)
The Franco-Swedish War (1805–1810)
The Finnish War (1808–1809)
The War of the Sixth Coalition (1813–1814)
The Campaign against Norway (1814)

Organisation 

1634(?)
Livkompaniet
Överstelöjtnantens kompani
Majorens kompani
Norra Wedbo kompani
Västra Härads kompani
Wässbo kompani
Ösbo härads kompani
Wista härads kompani

1814(?)
Livkompaniet
Norra Vedbo kompani
Västra Härads kompani
Vista kompani
Mo kompani
Norra Vestbo kompani
Östbo kompani
Södra Vestbo kompani

Commanding officers
Regimental commanders active at the regiment during the years 1623–1927.

1623–1631: Lars Kagg
1631–1700: ???
1700–1706: L Clerck
1706–1706: E Hillebard
1706–1710: Georg von Buchwaldt 
1709–1710: G W Fleetwood (acting)
1710–1710: H Hamilton
1710–1712: Anders Eriksson Leijonhielm
1712–1714: Carl Breitholtz (acting)
1714–1725: Henrik Otto von Albedyl
1725–1736: Christer Henrik d'Albedyhll
1736–1739: B Horn
1739–1747: P Silfversparre
1747–1761: Erik Gustaf Queckfeldt
1761–1772: Carl Fredrik Pechlin
1773–1774: Hugo Herman von Saltza
1774–1774: Hans Gustaf Gyllengranat
1774–1782: Germund Carl von Braunjohan
1782–1785: Otto Jacob Zöge von Manteuffel
1785–1790: Curt Philip Carl von Schwerin
1790–1797: A L von Friesendorff
1797–1810: W Bennet
1810–1816: Gustaf Bergenstråhle
1816–1818: C S von Hartmansdorff
1818–1849: H Stierngranat
1849–1857: Enar Nordenfelt
1857–1867: C J Munck
1867–1884: A M Leuhusen
1884–1892: H O E d'Ailly
1892–1901: Fredrik August Åstrand
1901–1909: Otto Ewert Mauritz Wolffelt
1909–1917: Per Ludwig Henrik Alexander Tham
1917–1926: Axel Steuch
1926–1927: Fredrik Lovén

Names, designations and locations

See also
List of Swedish regiments

Footnotes

References

Notes

Print

Further reading

Infantry regiments of the Swedish Army
Disbanded units and formations of Sweden
Military units and formations established in 1623
Military units and formations disestablished in 1927